is a 1995 Japanese film directed by Toshiharu Ikeda. The film was licensed in the US by Central Park Media and was released on DVD and VHS under their Asia Pulp Cinema label.

Cast
 Kaori Shimamura as Ran/"Black Orchid"
 Takanori Kikuchi as Yaguchi
 Hakuryu as Ho
 Dan Li
 Takeshi Yamato as Yoichi Fujinami
 Yuko Katagiri

English voice cast
The English dub was produced by Mercury Productions in New York City.

 Mary Ann Towne as Ran/Black Orchid
 Mark Percy as Yoichi Fujinami
 Scottie Ray as Yaguchi
 Tristan Goddard as Ho
 Hans Briekface as Shui
 Jeff Gimble as Li
 Eric Stuart as Takaki
 Ted Lewis as Ishizuka
 Suzy Prue as Mei Fan
 Bill Renie as Sakaki
 Pink Champagne as Chun Li
 Jody Lee

 See also Naked Killer''

External links
 

1995 films
Central Park Media
Films directed by Toshiharu Ikeda
Films shot in Japan
1990s erotic thriller films
Girls with guns films
Toei Company films
Japanese erotic thriller films
1990s Japanese films
1990s Japanese-language films